Geoffrey "Geoff" Wylie (born 23 September 1956 from Ballymena) is a retired Northern Irish professional darts player who currently plays in the Professional Darts Corporation events.

Darts career
Wylie played in three stages of the BDO World Darts Championship in the Last 16, but who losing Martin Adams in 1996 and Steve Beaton in 1997.

Wylie making his PDC debut of the 2006 PDC World Darts Championship, who lost Denis Ovens of England in the Last 64.

Wylie played in the 2008 UK Open, have losing to Justin Pipe of England in the Last 128.

World Championship results

BDO

 1996: 2nd Round (lost to Martin Adams 2–3)
 1997: 2nd Round (lost to Steve Beaton 0–3)
 1998: 1st Round (lost to Chris Mason 1–3)

PDC

 2006: 1st Round (lost to Denis Ovens 1–3)

References

External links
http://www.dartsdatabase.co.uk/PlayerDetails.aspx?playerKey=1410

1956 births
Living people
British Darts Organisation players
Darts players from Northern Ireland
Professional Darts Corporation former pro tour players
Sportspeople from Ballymena